Project: Kalki is a four-issue mini-series currently published by Virgin Comics. Created by writer Arjun Gaind with art by Vivek Shinde, it tells the story of the Kalki, the last Avatar of Vishnu, being created by an evil geneticist. The first issue shipped in May of 2008.

References

External links
 Project: Kalki, at Virgin Comics
 Review of Project: Kalki #1, Comic Book Resources

2008 comics debuts
Comic book limited series
Virgin Comics titles